Łukasz Wiśniowski (born 7 December 1991) is a Polish racing cyclist, who currently rides for UCI WorldTeam .

Career
He rode at the 2013 UCI Road World Championships. He was named in the start list for the 2016 Giro d'Italia. In July 2019, he was named in the startlist for the 2019 Tour de France. In October 2020, he was named in the startlist for the 2020 Vuelta a España.

Major results

2009
 8th Time trial, UCI Juniors World Championships
2011
 3rd Time trial, National Under-23 Road Championships
2012
 National Under-23 Road Championships
3rd Road race
3rd Time trial
2013
 National Under-23 Road Championships
1st  Road race
1st  Time trial
 1st Stage 1 Thüringen Rundfahrt der U23
 4th Overall Boucle de l'Artois
2014
 1st  Overall Circuit des Ardennes
 1st Kattekoers
 1st Stage 4 Tour de Normandie
 4th Ster van Zwolle
 5th Time trial, National Road Championships
 5th Grand Prix Královéhradeckého kraje
 6th Overall Tour de Bretagne
2015
 1st Stage 1 (TTT) Czech Cycling Tour
 2nd GP Briek Schotte
 3rd Ronde van Zeeland Seaports
 10th Overall Driedaagse van West-Vlaanderen
2016
 1st Stage 1 (TTT) Tour de San Luis
 2nd Overall Driedaagse van West-Vlaanderen
 4th Road race, National Road Championships
 5th Kuurne–Brussels–Kuurne
2017
 7th Trofeo Playa de Palma
 9th Trofeo Porreres–Felanitx–Ses Salines–Campos
2018
 2nd Omloop Het Nieuwsblad
 8th Kuurne–Brussels–Kuurne
2019
 5th Time trial, National Road Championships
2020
 3rd Time trial, National Road Championships
2021
 3rd Time trial, National Road Championships

Grand Tour general classification results timeline

References

External links
 

1991 births
Living people
Polish male cyclists
People from Ciechanów
Sportspeople from Masovian Voivodeship